Somewhere Out in Space is an album by German power metal band, Gamma Ray. It was released on 25 August 1997 and is the band's fifth studio album. Continuing in the tradition of the previous four albums, it contained yet another different lineup, but would also be the first album to feature the band's longest standing lineup. The album featured Dirk Schlächter on bass for the first time since his guest appearance on Heading for Tomorrow, Henjo Richter on guitar and Dan Zimmermann on drums.

The track "Watcher in the Sky" was recorded by Iron Savior and appears on their self-titled 1997 album. It features Piet Sielck on guitar and additional
vocals, and Thomen Stauch on drums.

The track "No Stranger (Another Day in Life)" was originally written as a contribution to Michael Kiske's solo album, but since Kiske rejected it as "too heavy" Hansen instead decided to record it with Gamma Ray.

"Miracle" is effectively a stylized version of "Man on a Mission" from Land of the Free, Gamma Ray's previous album. It has very similar lyrics, an identical chorus, and similar chord progressions, but at a slower tempo.

The song "Men, Martians and Machines" begins with the "five tones" from the 1977 film Close Encounters of the Third Kind played on strings.

Lyrical concepts
 "Beyond the Black Hole" is about travelling the unknown space to discover black holes.
 "Somewhere Out in Space" is about the science fiction franchise Star Trek.
 "The Landing" and "Valley of the Kings" is about the arrival of aliens on Earth millions of years ago.
 "Pray" is about the end of hope for the human race to be saved from extinction.
 "Shine On" is about the theory that extraterrestrial life visited Earth long before and planted the seeds of mankind.

Track listing

"Miracle" also appears on the Silent Miracles EP.
"Victim of Changes" also appears on the Valley of the Kings EP.

Credits
Gamma Ray
Kai Hansen – vocals, guitars, producer, engineer, mixing on tracks 4, 7, 9
Henjo Richter – guitars, keyboards
Dirk Schlächter – bass, guitar, producer, engineer, mixing on tracks 4, 7, 9
Dan Zimmermann – drums

Guest musicians
Piet Sielck – vocals and guitars on track 12
Thomen Stauch – drums on track 12

Production
Charlie Bauerfeind – mixing
Ralf Lindner – mastering

Charts

References

1997 albums
Gamma Ray (band) albums
Noise Records albums
Alien invasions in music
Albums produced by Kai Hansen